This article describes the qualifying of the 2016–17 Women's EHF Champions League.

Draw
The draw was held on 29 June 2016 at 13:00 in Vienna, Austria. The twelve teams were split in three groups and play a semifinal and final to determine the last participants. Matches will be played on 10 and 11 September 2016.

Seedings
The seedings were announced on 27 June 2016.

Qualification tournament 1
Glassverket IF organized the tournament.

Bracket

Semifinals

Third place game

Final

Qualification tournament 2
BM Bera Bera organized the tournament.

Bracket

Semifinals

Third place game

Final

Qualification tournament 3
Krim organized the tournament.

Bracket

Semifinals

Third place game

Final

References

External links
Official website

Qualifying